Pop Secret is an American brand of popcorn, owned and marketed by Snyder's-Lance – a subsidiary of Campbell Soup Company since 2017. Snyder's-Lance had acquired the Pop Secret brand from Diamond Foods in early 2016.

Pop Secret popcorns were introduced by General Mills in 1986.

Overview 
The brand was first launched in January 1986. Pop Secret was previously manufactured by General Mills and was purchased by the Diamond Foods in September 2008, for about $190 million.

Sponsorships 
Pop Secret formerly sponsored an annual NASCAR race called the "Pop Secret Microwave Popcorn 400" at Rockingham Speedway in North Carolina, as well as the race it was replaced by in 2004, the "Pop Secret 500" at Auto Club Speedway in Fontana, California. Pop Secret created a variety of colored popcorn called Pop Qwiz in the early-1990s. Colors included yellow, blue, green, and a mystery bag with a surprise color. Pop Secret created the What's Your Pop Secret? Theatre, which showcased and supported independent film makers.  Pop Secret continues to support Film Independent (FIND), a non profit organization that helps increase diversity in film making within the industry.

In 2014, Pop Secret introduced a pre-popped popcorn in a bag.

On September 15, 2015, it was announced that Pop Secret would become the official popcorn of the Disneyland Resort and the Walt Disney World Resort, as well as becoming the title sponsor of the nighttime show Fantasmic! at Disney's Hollywood Studios at Walt Disney World.

See also

 List of popcorn brands

References

External links
 

Popcorn brands
Products introduced in 1984